The Lebanon national under-23 football team, also known as the Lebanon Olympic football team, represents Lebanon in international football competitions in the Olympic Games, the Asian Games, and the AFC U-23 Asian Cup, as well as any other under-23 international football tournament. The team also serves as the national under-22 football team of Lebanon.

The selection is limited to players under the age of 23, except for the Olympics which allows the men's team up to three overage players. The team is controlled by the Lebanon Football Association. The side has never qualified for the Olympic Games nor the AFC U-23 Asian Cup. They have only participated once in the Asian Games, in 2002, in which they were eliminated in the group stage.

Competitive record

Summer Olympic Games

AFC U-23 Asian Cup

WAFF U-23 Championship

Asian Games

Recent results and matches

2022

Players

Current squad
Information correct as of 15 March 2023

|club=F.C. Alverca|clubnat=PRT}}

Recent call-ups
The following footballers were part of a national selection in the past 12 months, but are not part of the current squad.

See also
 Lebanon national football team
 Lebanon national under-20 football team
 Lebanon national under-17 football team
 Football in Lebanon

References

U23
Asian national under-23 association football teams
Youth football in Lebanon